Jetsada Jitsawad (born August 5, 1980) is a Thai retired professional footballer who played as a centre back.

International career

Jetsada was called up to the national team, in coach Peter Withe first squad selection for the  2002 Asian Games, 2002 Tiger Cup winners and squad selection for the 2004 Asian Cup.

International career statistics

Managerial career
On 1 June 2016, Pattaya United has appointed Jetsada Jitsawad as the caretaker to cover the resignation of Miloš Joksić.

Managerial statistic

 A win or loss by the penalty shoot-out is counted as the draw in time.

Honours

Club
Thailand Tobacco Monopoly
 Thai Premier League (1): 2004-05

Muangthong United
 Thai Premier League (2): 2009, 2010
 Kor Royal Cup (1): 2010

References

External links

1980 births
Living people
Jetsada Jitsawad
Jetsada Jitsawad
Association football central defenders
Jetsada Jitsawad
Jetsada Jitsawad
Jetsada Jitsawad
Jetsada Jitsawad
Jetsada Jitsawad
Jetsada Jitsawad
Jetsada Jitsawad
Jetsada Jitsawad
2004 AFC Asian Cup players
2007 AFC Asian Cup players
Footballers at the 2002 Asian Games
Jetsada Jitsawad
Jetsada Jitsawad